Zographus quadrimaculatus is a species of beetle in the family Cerambycidae. It was described by E. Forrest Gilmour in 1956. It is known from Tanzania.

References

Sternotomini
Beetles described in 1956